Irma Gonzalez may refer to:
Irma González (wrestler) (born 1938), Mexican luchadora
Irma Elsa Gonzalez (born 1948), United States federal judge